The 1905 Spanish general election was held on Sunday, 10 September (for the Congress of Deputies) and on Sunday, 24 September 1905 (for the Senate), to elect the 12th Cortes of the Kingdom of Spain in the Restoration period. All 404 seats in the Congress of Deputies were up for election, as well as 180 of 360 seats in the Senate.

Overview

Electoral system
The Spanish Cortes were envisaged as "co-legislative bodies", based on a nearly perfect bicameral system. Both the Congress of Deputies and the Senate had legislative, control and budgetary functions, sharing equal powers except for laws on contributions or public credit, where the Congress had preeminence. Voting for the Cortes was on the basis of universal manhood suffrage, which comprised all national males over 25 years of age, having at least a two-year residency in a municipality and in full enjoyment of their civil rights.

For the Congress of Deputies, 98 seats were elected using a partial block voting system in 28 multi-member constituencies, with the remaining 306 being elected under a one-round first-past-the-post system in single-member districts. Candidates winning a plurality in each constituency were elected. In constituencies electing eight seats or more, electors could vote for no more than three candidates less than the number of seats to be allocated; in those with more than four seats and up to eight, for no more than two less; in those with more than one seat and up to four, for no more than one less; and for one candidate in single-member districts. The Congress was entitled to one member per each 50,000 inhabitants, with each multi-member constituency being allocated a fixed number of seats. Additionally, literary universities, economic societies of Friends of the Country and officially organized chambers of commerce, industry and agriculture were entitled to one seat per each 5,000 registered voters that they comprised. The law also provided for by-elections to fill seats vacated throughout the legislature.

As a result of the aforementioned allocation, each Congress multi-member constituency was entitled the following seats:

For the Senate, 180 seats were indirectly elected by the local councils and major taxpayers, with electors voting for delegates instead of senators. Elected delegates—equivalent in number to one-sixth of the councillors in each local council—would then vote for senators using a write-in, two-round majority voting system. The provinces of Barcelona, Madrid and Valencia were allocated four seats each, whereas each of the remaining provinces was allocated three seats, for a total of 150. The remaining 30 were allocated to special districts comprising a number of institutions, electing one seat each—the archdioceses of Burgos, Granada, Santiago de Compostela, Seville, Tarragona, Toledo, Valencia, Valladolid and Zaragoza; the Royal Spanish Academy; the royal academies of History, Fine Arts of San Fernando, Exact and Natural Sciences, Moral and Political Sciences and Medicine; the universities of Madrid, Barcelona, Granada, Oviedo, Salamanca, Santiago, Seville, Valencia, Valladolid and Zaragoza; and the economic societies of Friends of the Country from Madrid, Barcelona, León, Seville and Valencia. An additional 180 seats comprised senators in their own right—the Monarch's offspring and the heir apparent once coming of age; Grandees of Spain of the first class; Captain Generals of the Army and the Navy Admiral; the Patriarch of the Indies and archbishops; and the presidents of the Council of State, the Supreme Court, the Court of Auditors, the Supreme War Council and the Supreme Council of the Navy, after two years of service—as well as senators for life (who were appointed by the Monarch).

Election date
The term of each chamber of the Cortes—the Congress and one-half of the elective part of the Senate—expired five years from the date of their previous election, unless they were dissolved earlier. The previous Congress and Senate elections were held on 26 April and 10 May 1903, which meant that the legislature's terms would have expired on 26 April and 10 May 1908, respectively. The monarch had the prerogative to dissolve both chambers at any given time—either jointly or separately—and call a snap election.

The Cortes were officially dissolved on 17 August 1905, with the dissolution decree setting the election dates for 10 September (for the Congress) and 24 September 1905 (for the Senate) and scheduling for both chambers to convene on 11 October.

Background

Results

Congress of Deputies

Senate

Distribution by group

Notes

References

Bibliography

1905 elections in Spain
1905 in Spain
1905
September 1905 events